Sir Thomas Melrose Coombe (3 December 1873 – 22 July 1959) was an Australian cricketer, businessman and philanthropist, best known for his role in the film industry of Western Australia.

Early life
Coombe was born at Melrose, South Australia, to Thomas Coombe and his wife Sarah (née Beddome). His father, of Cornish descent, was a timber and iron merchant who served as mayor of Broken Hill in 1890, having previously lived in Port Pirie. He moved to Western Australia in 1895, following the gold rushes, where he set up as a supplier of building materials, and subsequently served as mayor of the South Perth Municipality from 1906 to 1907.

His son was educated at Caterer's School, Norwood; Hahndorf College, Hahndorf; and Prince Alfred College, Adelaide. He moved with his family to Perth, where he established himself as an importer of sporting goods.

Coombe played cricket for the Claremont-Cottesloe Cricket Club, and also represented Western Australia against a number of touring sides from the eastern states. His only first-class match was against South Australia at the WACA Ground in January 1906. Batting at number five in both innings, he was caught and bowled for a duck in the first innings by Algy Gehrs, and made 15 in the second innings before being caught off the bowling of Pat Travers. Coombe later served as umpire in a single first-class match when South Australia toured at the end of the 1908–09 season.

Business career 
In 1910, Coombe formed a partnership with Thomas James West, a British cinema exhibitor who owned the largest cinema circuit in Australia. In 1913, he became local managing director of Union Cinemas, formed from the merger of West's company and a competitor. Coombe financed the construction of several large cinemas in Perth and Fremantle, including the Prince of Wales Theatre on Murray Street, the Ambassadors Theatre on Hay Street, and the Princess Theatre in Fremantle. Coombe also served as president of the Theatre Managers' Association from 1921 to 1928. In 1928, he retired from a managerial role but continued as a director of Union Cinemas.

Personal life 
Coombe was a noted philanthropist. In his role in the Theatre Managers' Association, he raised large sums of money for various causes, and also chaired the Boy Scouts Association of Western Australia. In 1921, he established the Coombe Scholarships, with a £5000 donation.

Coombe was a made a knight during a visit to England in June 1924, "in recognition of his public services". However, in 1931, he was prosecuted and found guilty of income tax evasion, and fined £100. After Union Cinemas collapsed the same year, Coombe was forced to sell much of his property, although his sons remained in the cinema business. He later moved to Glenelg, a suburb of Adelaide, and then to Surrey in England, where he died in 1959.

See also
 List of Western Australia first-class cricketers

References

1873 births
1959 deaths
Australian cricketers
Australian cricket umpires
Australian emigrants to England
Australian people of Cornish descent
Australian film people
Australian Knights Bachelor
People educated at Prince Alfred College
Cricketers from Adelaide
People convicted of tax crimes
Western Australia cricketers
Cricket players and officials awarded knighthoods
Australian philanthropists